This is a list of schools in Nunavut, Canada, sorted by school name.

See also
List of schools in Canada

References

External links
 Regional School Operations Homepage
 Department of Education, Government of Nunavut

Education in Nunavut
 
Nunavut
Schools